Stuart Block (born November 26, 1977) is a Canadian singer best known as the former lead vocalist for progressive death metal band Into Eternity and American heavy metal band Iced Earth. Before joining Into Eternity in 2005, Block began his musical career singing for various bands in Vancouver. After two albums with Into Eternity, Block joined Iced Earth in 2011 and recorded three albums during his ten-year tenure with the band: Dystopia (2011), Plagues of Babylon (2014) and Incorruptible (2017). He was the second-longest-serving vocalist of Iced Earth, behind Matt Barlow.

Career

Early career and Into Eternity
Block began his musical career in 1998, singing for various metal and rock acts around Vancouver. Before  joining Into Eternity, Block was the singer for the band Omega Crom, among others. In 2005, he joined Eternity, and the following year, the band released their first album with him, The Scattering of Ashes. Block received high praise for his performance, with Eduardo Rivadavia of AllMusic calling him "one of the finest metal voices of his generation". Block's second album with into Eternity, The Incurable Tragedy, was released in 2008. Respectively, in 2011 and 2012, the band released the singles "Sandstorm" and "Fukushima". Also, in late 2012, Block began demoing new material with Eternity and their new touring vocalist Amanda Kiernan.

Iced Earth
In March 2011, it was announced that Block had been chosen as the new lead singer for Iced Earth. Before releasing Block's first album with the group, Iced Earth released a re-recording of their 1995 song "Dante's Inferno" as a free download on their website. Dystopia, Block's first album with Iced Earth, was released on October 18, 2011. The album garnered positive reviews, with some calling it one of Iced Earth's best albums. Block also received praise for his performance. The band released its next Live CD/DVD on April 15, 2013, Live in Ancient Kourion. The album was recorded on August 19, 2012, at the 6,000-year-old Kourion Theater in Cyprus during the band's Dystopia World Tour.

Iced Earth began writing new material for their eleventh studio album in early 2013. The title was later confirmed as Plagues of Babylon, and the album was released in January 2014. Block's second album with the band received mostly positive reviews overall from music critics. In January 2014, the album reached position No. 5 on the German Media Control Charts. This is Iced Earth's highest chart position in their entire career. The band also reached No. 34 on the Ultratop charts in Belgium. Meanwhile, in the US, the album sold approximately 6,300 copies in its first week to debut at No. 49 on the Billboard 200.

Following a period of inactivity, Iced Earth started writing for their twelfth studio album tentatively titled The Judas Goat, with an expected release date and subsequent touring cycle in early 2016.

On February 15, 2021, a month after Schaffer's arrest following the 2021 storming of the United States Capitol, Block announced that he had left Iced Earth.

Annihilator
Stu Block recorded the song "Downright Dominate" with Annihilator in late 2021 for their rerecording of the album Metal, titled Metal II.
In January 2022,  Block would handle lead vocals on the band's future live shows. Guitarist, Jeff Waters, announced that he would step down as lead vocalist and focusing solely on lead guitar.

Singing style
Block is a self-described "hybrid vocalist", meaning that he uses vocal styles from many different genres of metal. He has listed Bruce Dickinson, Rob Halford, Daniel Heiman, Tim Roth, Matt Barlow, Tim Owens, Devin Townsend, Jari Mäenpää, George "Corpsegrinder" Fisher, Russell Allen and Jørn Lande as his influences as a singer.

Personal life
Block's mother was battling cancer when he joined Iced Earth. The song "End of Innocence" from Iced Earth's Dystopia was written for her by Block. His mother died on August 23, 2013.

Discography

Into Eternity
 2006: The Scattering of Ashes
 2008: The Incurable Tragedy
 2011: "Sandstorm" (single)
 2012: "Fukushima" (single)

Iced Earth
 2011: "Dante's Inferno 2011" (single)
 2011: 5 Songs (EP)
 2011: Dystopia
 2013: Live in Ancient Kourion
 2013: The Plagues (EP)
 2014: Plagues of Babylon
 2017: Incorruptible

Annihilator
 2022: Metal II

The Midgard Project
 2022: The Great Divide

References

External links

Stu Block's bio at Iced Earth's official website

Living people
Canadian heavy metal singers
Canadian male singers
Iced Earth members
1977 births